Asking for Trouble is a 1942 British comedy film directed by Oswald Mitchell and starring Max Miller, Carole Lynne and Wilfrid Hyde-White. Its plot follows a fishmonger who takes up bookmaking to earn extra cash.

Cast
 Max Miller as Dick Smith
 Carole Lynne as Jane Smythe
 Mark Lester as General Smythe
 Wilfrid Hyde-White as Pettifer
 Billy Percy as George
 Eleanor Hallam as Margarita
 Aubrey Mallalieu as General Fortescue
 Kenneth Kove as Captain Fortescue
 Chick Elliott as Mandy Lou
 Esma Cannon as Ada
 Lesley Osmond as Paulette
 Raymond Glendenning as Commentator

References

External links
 

1942 films
1940s English-language films
Films directed by Oswald Mitchell
1942 comedy films
British comedy films
Films set in London
British black-and-white films
1940s British films